Richard Williams (born 1 January 1869) was an English professional footballer who played as a goalkeeper.

Career
A native of Chesterfield, Williams began his career as a trainee with Everton, and was a member of the first team between 1891 and 1895, making a total of 70 appearances - 58 in the Football League and 12 in the FA Cup. Williams played in the 1893 FA Cup Final for Everton, and moved to Luton Town in February 1895.

References

1869 births
Year of death missing
English footballers
Everton F.C. players
Luton Town F.C. players
English Football League players
Association football goalkeepers
FA Cup Final players